The Chief of the Defense Staff (CDS) is the professional head of the Republic of Sierra Leone Armed Forces. He is  responsible for the administration and the operational control of the Sierra Leonean military. It is the highest rank military position in the country. 

In 1985, General Joseph Saidu Momoh, the army commander, succeed President Siaka Stevens. It is not clear what exactly Momoh's title was but it seems likely that he was the senior Sierra Leonean military officer and held the predecessor to the CDS's post.

Brigadier-General Tom Carew was Chief of Defence Staff from April 2000 to November 2003. He may have been promoted to Major General during his tenure. Major General Alfred Nelson-Williams was the Chief of the Defence Staff of the Republic of the Armed Forces, between 2008-2010. Nelson-Williams succeeded the retiring Major General Edward Sam M'boma on 12 September 2008. The current chief is Lieutenant general Brima Sesay.

List of chiefs

References

Military of Sierra Leone
Sierra Leone